Bartolomé Colombo (born 24 August 1916, date of death 15 November 1989) was an Argentine footballer. He played in 17 matches for the Argentina national football team from 1937 to 1945. He was also part of Argentina's squad for the 1945 South American Championship.

References

External links
 

1916 births
Year of death missing
Argentine footballers
Argentina international footballers
Place of birth missing
Association football defenders
Argentinos Juniors footballers
San Lorenzo de Almagro footballers
Club de Gimnasia y Esgrima La Plata footballers
Club Almagro players